Honduras sent a delegation to compete at the 2008 Summer Olympics in Beijing, China.

Athletics

Men

Women

Football

Honduras under-23 men's national football team qualified as winners of the 2008 CONCACAF Men's Pre-Olympic Tournament and competed in Group D alongside Nigeria, Italy and South Korea.

Men's tournament

Roster

Group play

Rowing

Men

Qualification Legend: FA=Final A (medal); FB=Final B (non-medal); FC=Final C (non-medal); FD=Final D (non-medal); FE=Final E (non-medal); FF=Final F (non-medal); SA/B=Semifinals A/B; SC/D=Semifinals C/D; SE/F=Semifinals E/F; QF=Quarterfinals; R=Repechage

Swimming

Men

Women

Taekwondo

See also
Honduras at the 2007 Pan American Games
Honduras at the 2010 Central American and Caribbean Games

References

Nations at the 2008 Summer Olympics
2008
Olympics